Gepp may refer to:

People
 Ethel Sarel Gepp (1864-1922), English phycologist
 Gerhard Gepp (born 1940), Austrian illustrator and designer
 Herbert William Gepp (1877–1954), Australian industrial chemist, businessman and public servant
 Mark Gepp ( 2010s), Australian politician
 Tim Gepp (born 1960), Australian rules footballer

Places
 Gepp, Arkansas, an unincorporated community in the U.S.

See also
 Gepps Cross, South Australia, a suburb of Adelaide, Australia
 Gepps Cross Football Club, Northfield, South Australia